The 2013 Sidekicks Premier season was the first season of the Premier Arena Soccer League affiliate of the Dallas Sidekicks professional indoor soccer club. The Dallas Sidekicks, a team in the Professional Arena Soccer League, launched Sidekicks Premier as a developmental affiliate to allow rookies and prospects to perform in a structured setting.

Sidekicks Premier, a South Central Division team, played their home games in the Inwood Soccer Center in Addison, Texas. The team was led by head coach Tatu with assistant coaches Mike Powers and Caesar Cervin. Team owner Ronnie Davis coached the team for one away game, the July 7th match against the Alamo City Warriors.

Season summary
The team finished the 8-game regular season with a 7–1 record, placing second in the South Central Division, just behind Austin FC who finished with a 7–0–1 record. The team qualified for post-season play but elected not to travel to California for the league playoffs. A 2014 summer season was planned but cancelled after the team was unable to secure a suitable venue.

Schedule

Regular season

Player roster
As of July 14, 2013

References

External links
Sidekicks Premier at Premier Arena Soccer League
Dallas Sidekicks official website

Dallas Sidekicks (2012–present) seasons
Sidekicks Premier 2013
Sidekicks Premier